The Shuttle is a 1918 American silent romance film directed by Rollin S. Sturgeon and starring Constance Talmadge, Alan Roscoe and Edith Johnson. The film is an adaptation of the novel of the same title by Frances Hodgson Burnett. It concerns two American sisters, one of whom is married into an English family.

Cast
 Constance Talmadge as Bettina Vandepoel 
 Alan Roscoe as Lord Mount Dunstan 
 Edith Johnson as Rosalie Vanderpoel 
 Edwin B. Tilton as Reuben Vanderpoel 
 Helen Dunbar as Mrs. Vanderpoel 
 George A. McDaniel as Sir Nigel Anstruthers 
 Thomas Persse as Penzance 
 Edward Peil Sr. as Ughtred Anstruthers 
 Casson Ferguson as G. Selden

References

Bibliography
 Jeanine Basinger. Silent Stars. Wesleyan University Press, 2000.

External links

1918 films
1918 drama films
Silent American drama films
Films directed by Rollin S. Sturgeon
American silent feature films
1910s English-language films
American black-and-white films
Selznick Pictures films
Films set in England
Films based on works by Frances Hodgson Burnett
1910s American films